Bondo District was an administrative district in the former Nyanza Province of Kenya. Its capital town was Bondo. The Bondo District had a population of 238,780 . The district was relatively new; it was created in 1998 from southern parts of the Siaya District.  Bondo district has since been further split off from Rarieda District to its east.

The district had only two constituencies: Bondo Constituency and Rarieda Constituency.

Local industries are fishing and family farming. The district bordered the shore of Lake Victoria.

In 2010, the district was eliminated and the area is now part of Siaya County.

District subdivisions

External links 
 Research findings - Bondo District
Map of Siaya District (before Bondo district was split)

 
Former districts of Kenya
Nyanza Province